Bavil-e Sofla (also Romanized as Bāvīl-e Soflá) is a village in Bavil Rural District, in the Central District of Osku County, East Azerbaijan Province, Iran. At the 2006 census, its population was 1,502, in 475 families.

References 

 Populated places in Osku County